Heather Cooney is a camogie player, a member of the Galway senior panel that won two Senior All Ireland Camogie finals of 2013 and 2019. Heather also won 2 all stars at wing back in 2015 and 2019. Heather is from the St Thomas’ club and is a sister to brothers Donal, Conor & Shane.

Other awards
All Ireland Intermediate medal 2009.

References

External links
 Camogie.ie Official Camogie Association Website

1989 births
Living people
Galway camogie players